Sky Lee (born September 15, 1952 as Sharon Lee) is a Canadian artist and novelist. Lee has published both feminist fiction and non-fiction and identifies as lesbian.

Personal life
Lee was born September 15, 1952 in Port Alberni, British Columbia. Her mother, Wong Mowe Oi, was a homemaker and her father, Lee Gwei Chang, was a millworker.

Moving to Vancouver in 1967 to attend university, she received a B.A. in Fine Arts at the University of British Columbia and a Diploma in Nursing from Douglas College. She became a member of the Asian Canadian Writers Workshop. Lee lives on Saltspring Island, British Columbia.

Career
Lee was first published as the illustrator of 1983's children's book, Teach Me to Fly, Skyfighter! by Paul Yee.  The book is a collection of four stories exploring what it is like to grow up as a Chinese-Canadian in a community with links to both Asian-Canadian and Anglo-Canadian cultures.  Reviewer Robert W. Bruinsma argued the book was "modestly illustrated."

Lee's first book, Disappearing Moon Cafe, published in 1990, explores the Wong family over four generations, as they operate the titled cafe.  Nominated for the Ethel Wilson Fiction Prize and the Governor General's Award, the novel won the City of Vancouver Book Award despite some critics charging that the writing was over-earnest.  For example, critic Gary Draper wrote, "Hardly a noun walks free of a trail of adjectives." Critic John Z. Ming Chen has studied Lee's literary works exhaustively from a Daoist perspective in The Influence of Daoism on Asian-Canadian Writers (Mellen, 2008). Disappearing Moon Café was reissued in 2017 by NeWest Press with an afterword by Chris Lee and an interview with the author conducted by Smaro Kamboureli.  Chris Lee comments: "SKY Lee's novel was a major intervention in contemporary Canadian literature, a bold attempt to account for the role of Chinese migrants in settler colonialism, a feminist interrogation of diaspora, family, and kinship, as well as a gesture towards queer futures."

In the same year, Lee contributed to the collective prose, Telling It: Women and Language Across Culture.  The book's writing is attributed to the "Telling It Book Collective", of which Lee was a member.  The book explores issues of racism and homophobia experienced by native, lesbian and Asian Canadian women.

In 1994, Lee published Bellydancer: Stories, a collection of 15 short stories that explore a range of feminist themes, with allegories focusing primarily on the "bellydancer," an archetype of survival.  The back cover of the book explains: "bellydancing was originally performed at the bedside of women in labor, as an erotic dance of creation."

Critical Studies:
Dr. John Z. Ming Chen's monograph, The Influence of Daoism on Asian-Canadian Writers (2008), features an entire chapter on SKY Lee's two book-length works of fiction published so far.

Her short stories have also appeared in Vancouver Short Stories as well as periodicals such as West Coast Line, The Asianadian , Kinethis, and Makara.

Bibliography
Teach Me to Fly, Skyfighter!: And Other Stories (as illustrator, text by Paul Yee) – 1983
Disappearing Moon Cafe – 1990
Telling It: Women and Language Across Cultures – 1990 (with Betsy Warland, Lee Maracle and Daphne Marlatt) Press Gang Publishers
Bellydancer: Stories – 1994

References

Canadian women novelists
Canadian feminist writers
Canadian lesbian writers
People from Port Alberni
Canadian writers of Asian descent
Canadian illustrators
Lesbian feminists
Canadian women artists
1952 births
Living people
20th-century Canadian novelists
Canadian LGBT novelists
Canadian women short story writers
20th-century Canadian women writers
20th-century Canadian short story writers
Lesbian novelists
20th-century Canadian LGBT people
Canadian lesbian artists